Ralph Edward Jenney (February 20, 1883 – July 13, 1945) was a United States district judge of the United States District Court for the Southern District of California.

Education and career

Jenney was born on February 20, 1883, in Detroit, Michigan, to Royal A. and Caliphernia (née Hoxsey) Jenney. In 1900, he graduated from high school at Ann Arbor High School in Ann Arbor, Michigan. He received an Artium Baccalaureus degree from the University of Michigan in 1904 followed by a Bachelor of Laws from the University of Michigan Law School in 1906. Jenney was admitted to the bar in Michigan in 1906 and moved to Oregon in 1908. That year he was admitted to the Oregon bar and entered private legal practice in Portland where he remained until 1912. He was in private practice of law in San Diego, California, from 1912 to 1937.

Federal judicial service

On June 23, 1937, President Franklin D. Roosevelt nominated Jenney to serve on the United States District Court for the Southern District of California to replace Judge Albert Lee Stephens Sr. who had been elevated to the United States Court of Appeals for the Ninth Circuit. Jenney was confirmed by the United States Senate on June 29, 1937, and received his commission on July 3, 1937. He served until his death on July 13, 1945, at the age of 62.

References

1883 births
1945 deaths
Judges of the United States District Court for the Southern District of California
United States district court judges appointed by Franklin D. Roosevelt
20th-century American judges
University of Michigan Law School alumni
Lawyers from Detroit
People from Ann Arbor, Michigan